The Grand Council of Ticino (Italian: Gran Consiglio di Ticino) is the legislature for the Swiss canton of Ticino. The 90-member council is elected every four years by proportional representation in a single constituency comprising the citizens resident in the canton, and meets at the Ursoline Palace in the capital, Bellinzona. Members are called Deputies (deputati).

Elections coincide with those of the canton's executive body, the Council of State. The last elections were on 7 April 2019. The President and two Vice-Presidents are selected by the members of the Grand Council, and not the electorate. Minutes of meetings are made public.

The Grand Council appoints the members of the canton's judiciary (save for justices of the peace, who are elected in their area by the citizens) and public prosecutors.

Composition
 Liberal Radical Party (Partito Liberale Radicale, PLR): 23
 Ticino League (Lega dei Ticinesi, Lega): 18
 Democratic People's Party (Partito Popolare Democratico, PPD): 16
 Socialist Party (Partito Socialista, PS): 13
 The Greens (I Verdi): 6
 Democratic Union of the Centre (Unione Democratica di Centro, UDC): 6
 Movement for Socialism (Movimento per il Socialismo, MPS): 3
 Communist Party (Partito Comunista, PC): 2
 More Women (Più Donne): 2
 Federal Democratic Union (Unione Democratica Federale, UDF): 1 (elected on the UDC list)
 Groups

Building
Both the Ticinese Council of State and the Grand Council meet at the Ursuline Palace. The palace was first built as a convent in 1738 for Ursuline nuns. The legislative and executive organs first convened in the Palace on 20 May 1803, the year of the Canton's admission to the Confederation, at a Benedictine monastery. On 26 August 1803, the first session was held. In 1848, the Law on the Suppression of Monasteries forced the Ursuline nuns to leave, and the premises have been solely occupied by the legislative and executives organs of the Canton of Ticino since.

References

Ticino
Ticino
Bellinzona
Organisations based in Bellinzona